The Holy Trinity is the Christian concept of God as three entities: the Father, the Son and the Holy Spirit.

Holy Trinity may also refer to:

Paintings
 Holy Trinity (Botticelli), a 1490s altarpiece by Sandro Botticelli
 Holy Trinity (Lotto), a c. 1519-1520 painting by Lorenzo Lotto
 Holy Trinity (Masaccio), a 1428 fresco in a church in Florence, Italy
 Holy Trinity (Raphael and Perugino), a 16th-century fresco in San Severo church in Perugia, Italy

Other uses
 Holy Trinity (colleges) or the Big Three, Harvard, Princeton, and Yale
 Holy trinity (cooking), a mix of vegetables in Cajun cookery
 Holy Trinity (film), a 2019 American comedy film directed by and starring Molly Hewitt
 "The Holy Trinity" (The Grand Tour), an episode of The Grand Tour, or the trio of hypercars featured in the episode

See also
 ARA Santísima Trinidad (D-2) "Most Holy Trinity", a 1974 Argentinian warship
 Feast of the Holy Trinity or Trinity Sunday, which celebrates the Christian doctrine of the Trinity
 Holy Trinity Academy (disambiguation)
 Holy Trinity Anglican Church (disambiguation)
 Holy Trinity Cathedral (disambiguation)
 Holy Trinity Catholic High School (disambiguation)
 Holy Trinity Church (disambiguation)
 Holy Trinity College (disambiguation)
 Holy Trinity Episcopal Church (disambiguation)
 Holy Trinity Greek Orthodox Church (disambiguation)
 Holy Trinity High School (disambiguation)
 Holy Trinity School (disambiguation)
 House of the Holy Trinity or Soutra Aisle, a ruined church in southern Scotland
 Trimurti, the Hindu Trinity
 Trinity (disambiguation)
 Unholy Trinity (disambiguation)